Jo Dong-rim (born March 25, 1985), better known by the stage name Mad Clown, is a South Korean rapper, songwriter, and record producer. He debuted with the single "Luv Sickness" in 2008 and released his first extended play, Anything Goes, in 2011. He broke into the mainstream following the release of "Stupid in Love," his hit 2013 collaboration with Soyou of the girl group Sistar. He has since released the extended plays Ferocity (2014), Piece of Mine (2015), Love is a Dog From Hell (2017), and 0 (2020).

Early life 
Jo Dong-rim was born just outside of Chicago in Evanston, Illinois on March 25, 1985. He and his parents moved back to South Korea when he was around one year old. His family sent him back to the U.S. to study when he was 14. Growing up he was heavily influenced by Rapper 2Pac. He was pursuing a degree in Sociology in the U.S. but later left his studies to continue to pursue music.

Career

2008–2012: Debut and early career 
Mad Clown debuted in 2008 and released his first EP in 2011.

2013–2018: Starship Entertainment, collaborations, and television judge 
He has worked on several collaborations, including Stupid in Love with South Korean singer Soyou from the South Korean group Sistar, released on September 10, 2013.

On March 28, 2014, Starship Entertainment announced on their Twitter account that Sistar's Hyolyn would feature in Mad Clown's comeback track, "Without You". The music video for "Without You" was released on April 3, 2014.

On December 12, 2014, Mad Clown featured on "Anxious" by Melody Day. In December, he also began working as a mentor on No.Mercy, a survival show of trainees from Starship Entertainment which led to the formation of Monsta X. In 2015, he featured on Jooheon of Monsta X's first mixtape, SUPEXX.

Mad Clown released his third extended play Piece of Mine in January 2015.

In 2016, he was a judge and producer for the fifth season of Show Me the Money.

In 2018, Mad Clown did not renew his contract with Starship. That year, he also participated in the seventh season of "Show Me The Money" under the alias of "MOMMY SON", donning a pink ski mask to cover his appearance. After being eliminated from the show, he released the song, "Shonen Jump (ft. Bae Gisung)" in mock retaliation against those who eliminated him. He also performed the song during the filming of the final episode of the show.

2019–present: New label, more collaborations, further releases 
In January 2019, Mad Clown collaborated with Stella Jang, releasing the single "No Question".

In September 2020, Mad Clown announced his first EP following his departure from Starship. The album, titled 0, will be released on October 6 through Sameside Company and has four ballads.

Personal life 
Mad Clown's younger brother is film and television actor Jo Hyeon-cheol.

Mad Clown married his non-celebrity wife on May 15, 2016, after a year of dating. He has a child, a son.

On September 22, 2022, Mad Clown revealed that he divorced his non-celebrity wife the year prior after 5 years of marriage.

Discography

Extended plays

Singles

Soundtrack appearances

Other charted songs

Filmography

Television

Awards and nominations

Gaon Chart Music Awards

Golden Disc Awards

Melon Music Awards

Mnet Asian Music Awards

References 

1985 births
Living people
Show Me the Money (South Korean TV series) contestants
Starship Entertainment artists
South Korean male rappers
South Korean hip hop record producers
South Korean singer-songwriters
Melon Music Award winners
South Korean male singer-songwriters